Zoe Hobbs (born 11 September 1997 in Stratford) is a New Zealand athlete. She is the current Oceania area record holder for the 100 metres.

Biography
At the 2013 World Youth Championships in Donetsk, Ukraine, Hobbs made the semi-finals of 100 metres.

She set the current NZ under-19 and under-20 100 m record of 11.53 s (+1.7 m/s) on 20 July 2016 in the heats of the 2016 IAAF World U20 Championships held in Bydgoszcz, Poland, progressing as the sixth fastest qualifier to the semi-finals where she ran 11.67 s (+0.4).

Hobbs competed in Summer Universiades in Taipei in 2017 and Napoli in 2019 respectively, making the final of the 200 m and winning a bronze medal as a member of the New Zealand 4 × 100 m relay team at the Napoli Universiade. In 2019, she also competed in 100 metres and 200 metres at the 2019 World Athletics Championships staged in Doha, Qatar.

In 2021, Hobbs twice equalled the NZ 100 m record of 11.32, held by Michelle Seymour, before lowering it on 18 December to 11.27 (+1.7).

In early 2022 she broke the 100 m record twice more with 11.21 (+1.7) on 22 January and 11.15 (+1.4) on 12 February. At the World Indoor Championships held in mid-March in Belgrade, Serbia, Hobbs broke the Oceania indoor 60 metres record with 7.13 seconds to be seventh fastest in the heats, thus qualifying for the semi-finals where she ran 7.16 s, 0.02 outside a finals berth. Hobbs won the Australian Athletics Championships 100 m on 1 April that year in a new championship record time of 11.17 s (+1.1). She first broke the Oceania 100 m record on 7 June in winning the final at the Oceania Athletics Championships in Mackay, Australia with a time of 11.09 s (+0.8). On 16 July, she ran 11.08 s (+0.7) when finishing second in the first heat of the World Athletics Championships held in Eugene, Oregon.

On 2 March 2023, Hobbs lowered the Oceania and NZs all-comers' 100 m records with a time of 11.07 s (+1.8) in the heats of the NZ National Championships in Wellington. In the final she ran 10.89 s, but the wind assistance of +3.4m/s exceeded the +2.0 m/s limit allowable for records. On 11 March at the Sydney Track Classic, Hobbs officially broke the 11-second barrier with 10.97 s (+0.5) to again lower the Oceania record, setting also a new Australian all-comers' record. Five days later at the Sir Graeme Douglas International meet in Auckland, she lowered her New Zealand all-comers' record to 11.02 (+1.3).

Personal bests

References

External links
 

1997 births
Living people
New Zealand female sprinters
Commonwealth Games competitors for New Zealand
Athletes (track and field) at the 2022 Commonwealth Games
World Athletics Championships athletes for New Zealand
Australian Athletics Championships winners
People from Stratford, New Zealand
Universiade medalists in athletics (track and field)
Universiade bronze medalists for New Zealand